Michael Bazyler (born 1952) is an American professor of law and 1939 Society Law Scholar in Holocaust and Human Rights Studies at Chapman University. He previously taught at Whittier Law School. His book Holocaust Justice: The Battle for Restitution in America’s Courts was cited by the United States Supreme Court while Holocaust, Genocide, and the Law was a 2016 Jewish Book Council winner.

Works

References

External links
Official website

Living people
Chapman University School of Law faculty
Place of birth missing (living people)
1952 births